Goodnight Miss Ann is a 1978 American short documentary film directed by August Cinquegrana. It was nominated for an Academy Award for Best Documentary Short The Academy Film Archive preserved Goodnight Miss Ann in 2012.

References

External links

1978 films
1978 short films
1978 documentary films
American short documentary films
1970s short documentary films
1970s English-language films
1970s American films